The following is a timeline of the history of the city of Guadalajara, Mexico.

Prior to 19th century

 1542 – February 14: Guadalajara founded in New Spain.
 1560
 Town becomes capital of Nueva Galicia province.
 Royal Audiencia of Guadalajara relocated to Guadalajara from Compostela.
 1591 – Jesuit college founded.
 1618 – Guadalajara Cathedral built.
 1690 – Sanctuary of Nuestra Señora del Carmen founded.
 1692 – Templo de San Francisco de Asís (church) built.
 1774 – Governor's Palace built on Plaza de Armas.
 1786 – Spanish intendancy established.
 1792
 University of Guadalajara founded.
 Population: 24,249.
 1795 – Consulado (merchant guild) established.

18th century

 1811 – Mint built.
 1817 – May 31: Severe earthquake.
 1829 – Hospicio Cabañas inaugurated.
 1848 – Panteón de Belén (cemetery) established.
 1849 – Earthquake.
 1854 – Guadalajara Cathedral towers rebuilt.
 1859 – War of Reform (approximate date).
 1861 – Public Library of the State of Jalisco established.
 1863 – French occupation begins.
 1866
 Teatro Degollado inaugurated.
 French occupation ends.
 1867 – Club Popular de Artesanos active.
 1875 – Earthquake.
 1895 – Population: 83,934.
 1896 – Casa de los Perros built.
 1897 – Templo Expiatorio del Santísimo Sacramento (church) construction begins.
 1900 – Population: 101,208.

20th century
 1906 – Club Deportivo Guadalajara (football club) formed.
 1907 – Automobile Club of Guadalajara conducts car race near city.
 1908 – Southern Pacific railway begins operating.
 1914 – Mexican Revolution.
 1916 – Club Atlas (football club) formed.
 1917 – El Informador newspaper begins publication.
 1925 – University of Guadalajara re-established.
 1932 – June 3: 1932 Jalisco earthquake.
 1939 – José Clemente Orozco paints murals in the Hospicio Cabañas.
 1942
 El Occidental newspaper begins publication.
 Alameda Theatre opens.
 1950
 Jalisco Philharmonic Orchestra established.
 Population: 378,423.
 1952 – Rotonda de los Jaliscienses Ilustres and Town Hall built.
 1954 – XEWK-AM radio begins broadcasting.
 1958 – San Juan de Dios Market inaugurated.
 1960
 Jalisco Stadium opens.
 Population: 740,396.
 1966 – Miguel Hidalgo y Costilla International Airport opens.
 1968 – Centro de Enseñanza Técnica Industrial founded.
 1969 – Plaza del Sol shopping mall in business.
 1972 – Templo Expiatorio del Santísimo Sacramento (church) built.
 1973 – Liga Comunista 23 de Septiembre formed.
 1975 – Federation of Low-Income Neighbourhoods formed.
 1976 – Trolleybuses begin operating.
 1979 – Supermercados Gigante (supermarket) opens.
 1983 – Sister city relationship established with Portland, Oregon, USA.
 1986 – Guadalajara International Film Festival begins.
 1987 – Guadalajara International Book Fair begins.
 1988
 Guadalajara Zoo opens.
 Festival Cultural de Mayo begins.
 1989 – Guadalajara light rail system begins operating.
 1990 – Population: 1,650,042.
 1991 – XHGJG-TV begins broadcasting.
 1992 – April 22: Gasoline explosions in Analco.
 1994 – Encuentro del Mariachi begins.
 1996 – Guadalajara Gay Pride inaugurated.
 1997 – December: "Freak snowfall."
 1998 – Francisco Javier Ramírez Acuña becomes mayor.

21st century

 2002 – Oficina para Proyectos de Arte (art space) founded.
 2004 – EU-Latin American-Caribbean summit held; prompts protest.
 2005 – City designated an American Capital of Culture.
 2007
 Pan American Volleyball Complex opens.
 Alfonso Petersen becomes mayor.
 2008 – Nissan Gymnastics Stadium opens.
 2009
 Guadalajara Macrobús begins operating.
 Jorge Aristóteles Sandoval Díaz elected mayor.
 2010
 Telcel Tennis Complex and Pan American Hockey Stadium open.
 Population: 1,495,182.
 2011 – October: 2011 Pan American Games held.
 2012
 May: Peace march.
 Ramiro Hernández García becomes Presidencia Municipal.

See also
 Guadalajara history
 
 List of mayors of Guadalajara
  (state)

References

This article incorporates information from the Spanish Wikipedia.

Bibliography

in English

Published in the 19th century
 
 
 
 
 
 

Published in the 20th century
 
 
 
 
 
 

Published in the 21st century

in Spanish
 
 
  (Annotated list of titles published in Guadalajara, arranged chronologically)

External links

  (includes Guadalajara )

 
Guadalajara